Myriam Fares  (born 3 May 1983) is a Lebanese singer, actress, and entertainer. Fares began her career in 2003, and released her debut single "Ana Wel Shoq". Following the success of that single, she would released her self-titled debut studio album Myriam (2003). She's known in the Arab world as the 'Queen of The Stage' for her unique performances and for being the one of the only Arab female artists who performs choreographed dance routines while singing.

Her fifth studio album Aman (2015) broke record for being the most played album on the streaming service Anghami and also made her acting debut with the TV series Itiham. In 2021, Fares starred in her own Netflix documentary show Myriam Fares: The Journey which made her the first Arab artist to have a documentary on Netflix and also ranked at number 1 in the Arab countries. Her 2018 single "Goumi" gained popularity on TikTok after a viral dance challenge created by the artist herself and has surpassed 8.4 billion total views. In 2022, Fares collaborated with Trinidadian rapper Nicki Minaj and Colombian singer Maluma on the official FIFA World Cup single "Tukoh Taka".

Life and career

1983–2005: Early life, beginnings and Nadini 
Fares was born in Kafar Shlal, a small village in Southern Lebanon, near Saida. She started learning classic ballet at the age of five. She appeared in the television program 'Al Mawaheb Al Saghira' and was awarded the first prize in oriental dancing. She later joined the Lebanese National Conservatory, spending four years learning the principles of oriental singing. At the age of seventeen, she participated in the TV program 'Studio-El-Fann' in 2000-2001 under the category of the Lebanese song. Myriam won the prize of best singer in the South of Lebanon, which was followed by Dr. Walid Ghoulmiye's prize as best singer in South Lebanon, Beirut and Mount Lebanon.

In 2003, Myriam signed with Music Master Records and released her first song titled "Ana Wel Shoq" from her debut studio album Myriam. The single and music video became a major success and it spread throughout the Arab world and was played on all Arab televisions. Another song from the album called "La Tes'alni" received a music video. She would also launch her first fragrance, named after her single "Ana Wel Shoq". Myriam's sophomore studio album, Nadini, was released in 2005. It featured three music video for the songs "Nadini", "Haklik Rahtak" and "Waheshny Eah".

2007–2011: Bet'oul Eih, Silina and Min Oyouni 
In 2007, Fares released her first Khaliji pop song titled "Moukanoh Wein" which served as the lead single from her third studio album Bet'oul Eih. The next year, she released music videos for the second and third singles "Mouch Ananiya" and "Eih Elly Byehsal" and the album was released in April 2008. She spent the year promoting the album and it became one of her most successful albums to date, she also released two more music video from the album that were "Ayyam El Sheety" and "Betrouh". In 2009, Myriam starred in the movie Silina.

Personal life
Fares, born in Kfar Chellal, Sidon District to a Maronite Christian family, married a Lebanese-American businessman Danny Mitri in a Cyprus ceremony in August 2014. They have two boys born in February 2016 and October 2020.

Controversy
Fares has often been criticized for her "provocative" style of entertainment, especially her choice of wardrobe, and hair style, creating accusations of imitating Colombian pop star Shakira.

Cyber attack
In 2015, she was amongst several famous Christian celebrities within the Arab world targeted by extremist cyber trolls for celebrating Easter.

Discography

Studio albums 

 Myriam (2003)
 Nadini (2005)
 Bet'oul Eih (2008)
 Min Oyouni (2011)
 Aman (2015)

Singles

Other charted songs

Filmography
2009: Silina (Movie)
2010: Fawazeer Myriam Fares (TV program)
2014: Itiham (TV series)
2021: Myriam Fares : The Journey (Netflix Documentary)

References

External links

 

1983 births
Living people
People from South Governorate
21st-century Lebanese women singers
People from South Lebanon
Lebanese women singers
Lebanese female dancers
Lebanese film actresses
Lebanese television actresses
Lebanese Maronites